Noah Manuel Rupp (born 13 August 2003) is a Swiss football player. He plays for Luzern.

Club career
He made his Swiss Super League debut for Luzern on 8 August 2021 in a game against Zürich. Four days later, he made his European debut in a Conference League qualifier against Feyenoord.

References

External links
 

2003 births
People from Zug
Sportspeople from the canton of Zug
Living people
Swiss men's footballers
Switzerland youth international footballers
Association football midfielders
FC Luzern players
Swiss 1. Liga (football) players
Swiss Super League players